The Penske PC-19 also known as the Penske 90 was a CART Penske Racing car which was constructed for competition in the 1990 season. The chassis was fielded by Penske Racing.

Emerson Fittipaldi won the pole position for the 1990 Indianapolis 500 with the car.

Complete Indy Car World Series results
(key) (Results in bold indicate pole position; results in italics indicate fastest lap)

References

External links
 penskeracing.com

Indianapolis 500
Team Penske
American Championship racing cars